Pablo Cuevas and Marcel Granollers were the defending champions, but Granollers chose to compete in Rotterdam.
Cuevas played with Eduardo Schwank, but lost to Fabio Fognini and David Marrero in the quarterfinals.
Marcelo Melo and Bruno Soares won the title, defeating Pablo Andújar and Daniel Gimeno-Traver 7–6(4), 6–3 in the final.

Seeds

Draw

Draw

References
 Main Draw

Brasil Open - Doubles
2011 Brasil Open